Patrick Michael "Pat" Evans (El Cajon, California, April 28, 1955 - Bologna, April 6, 1977) was an American motorcycle racer. Following a serious accident on April 3, 1977 at the Imola 200, he remained in a coma and died three days later in Bologna hospital at the age of 21.

Career
Evans finished 59th on a Yamaha TZ700 in the 1974 Daytona 200.

1976 Season
In 1976 Evans make his debut in the world championship. The first race he took part in was the French Grand Prix, racing the Bugatti Circuit in the 250 class. Evans qualified second but on the day of the race he was accused by Eric Offenstadt and Bernard Fau of racing with a 350 cc machine and the two French riders who tried to chase him off the grid. Evans had only used a 350 during Friday practice, whilst waiting for the arrival of the 250, to familiarise himself with the circuit. He had told other rider of this who raised no objections, but had failed to notify the stewards. As there was no evidence that he had used a 350 during Saturday's qualifying, the stewards gave the green light for him to race. Evans retired on lap 5 due to a mechanical problem. At the Bol d'Or he dominated for the first three quarters of an hour setting the lap record, but due to mechanical problems with the Yamaha TZ700 was forced to retire. At the 400 miles of Thruxton he was co-rider with Jean-Claude Chemarin, replacing the injured Christian Leon. On a works Honda 941, Chemarin/Evans finished second, just one minute behind Christian Huguet and Roger Ruiz, also on a factory Honda.

1977 Season 
In 1977 Evans was going to take part in the whole season of Formula 750 and the Transatlantic Trophy. At the Daytona 200 he started in 13th position and immediately took command of the race but, probably due to excessive enthusiasm, he lost control of the bike and crashed at the fourth corner, eventually finishing in eighth position.

Fatal accident 
On April 3, 1977, at the Imola 200, Evans was in third position when, due to a seizure at the Tamburello curve, he was thrown from his bike and, rolling for about fifty meters, hit the straw bales that served as protection at the edge of the circuit. According to the journalist Giancarlo Cevenini, if Evans had worn a fiberglass helmet he would have been saved, as the impact was excessively violent. Evans, however, due to the sponsor, had to race with an ABS helmet. Evans was unconscious and was taken to Bologna Hospital, where he died on April 6.

Another American rider who took part in the Imola 200 and a contemporary of Evans, Randy Cleek, was killed in a road accident returning from the race.

References

1955 births
1977 deaths
People from El Cajon, California
American motorcycle racers
250cc World Championship riders
Racing drivers who died while racing
Sport deaths in Italy